Qlimax is an annual hardstyle and hard dance event in the Netherlands. It is a major attraction held by Q-dance, and considered to be one of the leading hardstyle events, attracting nearly 30,000 people annually. It contains some of the most sophisticated production and setup, as well as sound system for any Q-dance event.

History
During the first few years following Qlimax's debut, the event used to have several editions each year. Since 2004, it was changed to the third or fourth week of November. At first it was held at the Beursgebouw (Eindhoven) and then moved to various other venues such as the SilverDome (Zoetermeer) and Heineken Music Hall (Amsterdam), but has now settled at the GelreDome (Arnhem).

Artists and event
Many artists consider being chosen to play at Qlimax as a highlight since the event is used to showcase the most successful artists in their respective genre. The beginning saw the lineup featuring genres ranging from Hardhouse to Techno. This was changed to traditionally begin with one Hardtrance act, numerous Hardstyle acts and then finish off with one Hardcore/Gabber act. This was changed in 2008 with the removal of the Jumpstyle act and in 2009 with the replacement of the Hardtrance act to one playing early Hardstyle.

in 2021 the event would have taken place during the day for the first time, to adhere to the COVID-19 pandemic precautions and guidelines at that time in the Netherlands. A week before the event was due, the event was cancelled and adapted to an online event.

The sound, light, pyrotechnic and stage setup at Qlimax is substantial. Around 350 L'Acoustics speaker boxes are deployed in the arena, with a majority being suspended from the ceiling. The conventional part of the lighting setup is controlled from 3 light desks, and the laser show is done by a certified laser show operator. FOH is placed out in the crowd, giving the technicians the overview they need, as well as the sound coverage needed to ensure everyone is having the most ideal possible sound at all times.

Anthems
Like most of the Q-dance events, an anthem is made every year by the headlining DJ (with the exception of 2001 and 2002) to represent that edition. Below is a list of the anthems for each edition:

Dutch Anthems
 2003: The Prophet – Follow the Leader
 2003: Deepack – The Prophecy
 2004: Future Tribes – Deadlock (Unofficial)
 2005: DJ Zany – Science & Religion
 2006: Alpha² – The Dark Side (Co-produced by JDX)
 2007: Headhunterz – The Power of the Mind
 2008: Technoboy – Next Dimensional World
 2009: D-Block & S-te-Fan – The Nature Of Our Mind
 2010: Brennan Heart – Alternate Reality
 2011: Zatox – No Way Back
 2012: Psyko Punkz – Fate or Fortune
 2013: Gunz For Hire ft. Ruffian – Immortal Essence
 2014: Noisecontrollers – The Source Code of Creation
 2015: Atmozfears – Equilibrium
 2016: Coone – Rise of the Celestials
 2017: Wildstylez – Temple of Light
 2018: Sub Zero Project – The Game Changer
 2019: B-Front – Symphony of Shadows
 2020: None (each artist made an anthem for the source movie)
 2021: Ran-D ft. Charlotte Wessels – The Reawakening
 2022: Ran-D ft. Charlotte Wessels – The Reawakening

Editions

Most significant artists

See also
 List of electronic music festivals

References

External links 

 Q-dance Website
 Report about Qlimax 2009
 Qlimax 2010 Website
 Report about Qlimax 2010
 Qlimax 2011 Website
 Qlimax 2012 Website
 Qlimax 2013 Website
 Qlimax 2014 Website
 Qlimax 2015 Website

Music festivals established in 2000
Electronic music festivals in the Netherlands
Trance festivals